Supernova is a nightclub in SoDo, Seattle, in the U.S. state of Washington. The venue opened in 2021.

The venue has hosted events organized by Sapphic Seattle. Supernova has also hosted the drag competition and dance party Fruit Bowl.

References

External links 

 

2021 establishments in Washington (state)
Nightclubs in Seattle
SoDo, Seattle